This is a list of all non-comics media appearances of the Marvel Comics character, Professor X.

Television

Animation 

 Xavier made his first ever animated appearance on the 1966 The Marvel Super Heroes episode of The Sub-Mariner with the original X-Men line-up (Angel, Beast, Cyclops, Iceman, and Jean Grey). In this incarnation, he and the X-Men are never referred to as the X-Men, but instead referred to as Allies for Peace.
 Xavier made guest appearances on the animated series Spider-Man and His Amazing Friends voiced by Stan Jones.
 Xavier appeared in the 1989 pilot X-Men: Pryde of the X-Men, voiced by John Stephenson.
 Xavier appears in the X-Men animated series, which ran on Fox Kids from 1992–1997 voiced by Cedric Smith. He appears in 20 episodes as a core member of the regular character lineup. In this series he uses a hovering wheelchair similar to that provided by Lilandra in the comics.
 Cedric Smith also voiced the role in two episodes of Spider-Man featuring the X-Men. Spider-Man tries to get help from Professor X to find out what he is mutating into only to learn that Professor X does not have the ability to know.
 He appeared as a regular cast member in the Kids' WB animated series X-Men: Evolution. Here, he is voiced by David Kaye. Unlike in the previous series, Xavier uses a conventional wheelchair. During the finale of the series, Apocalypse uses his alien technology to take control of Xavier and make him one of his four horsemen, along with Magneto, Storm and Mystique. As an unintended side-effect of the technology, Xavier's consciousness was able to glimpse into the future and see the changes, good and bad, that would come.
 Professor X appears in the Robot Chicken episode "Sausage Fest" voiced by Seth Green. After the featured X-Men were killed in battle with a Sentinel (with him asking if he can delete Real World/Road Rules Challenge off the TiVo after that), he recruits the cast of the Police Academy films to his team. During that segment, Larvell Jones was making sounds that caused Professor X to think that his wheelchair is squeaking until Professor X found out and telepathically erased Larvell's brain. After that, his wheelchair still squeaked. Carey Mahoney sneaked a prostitute underneath his podium during graduation. When his new team is kicked far by a Sentinel, Professor X asks it "Same time next week?"
 Professor X appears in Wolverine and the X-Men voiced by Jim Ward. An unexpected attack upon the X-Men causes Professor X and Jean Grey to disappear. Emma Frost finds him in a coma on Genosha under the care of Magneto, who found him there. After waking from his coma, Professor X reveals that he was in the future one in which much of the world is in devastation with Sentinels prevalent, and tells the X-Men not to give up defending the mutant race. During his time in the future, Professor X uses the technology of the time to regain the ability to walk, and assembles a contemporary team of X-Men. During a final confrontation with Master Mold, Professor X is rescued by the Wolverine of that time and four clones of X-23. Their efforts result in a timeline in which Earth is ruled by Apocalypse.
 Professor X appears in The Super Hero Squad Show episode "Mysterious Mayhem at Mutant Academy", voiced again by Jim Ward. He is shown riding his hovering wheelchair from the comics.
 Professor X appears in the Astonishing X-Men motion comic voiced by Dan Green.
 Professor X was a regular character in Marvel Anime: X-Men voiced by Katsunosuke Hori in the Japanese version and by Cam Clarke in the English dub.
 Professor X appears in the Toei anime series Marvel Disk Wars: The Avengers, voiced by Osamu Saka in Japanese and Cam Clarke in English.
 Professor X appears in the Iron Man: Armored Adventures episode "The X-Factor" voiced by Ron Halder (who also voiced Magneto in that episode). At the end of the episode, he approaches Jean Grey into joining his special school and reveals to her that he is also a mutant. While his name is given, Xavier's face is not actually seen in this appearance and his wheelchair was pushed by an unnamed nurse.

Live action 

A television series based on David Haller, the schizophrenic son of Charles Xavier / Professor X, titled Legion premiered on February 8, 2017. The series is jointly produced by Fox Entertainment, and Marvel Television, and  aired on the FX network. The series was released first establishing itself as a standalone installment, though it also has connections to the X-Men film universe. In Legion David Haller learns that he was adopted by the family that raised him and eventually deduces that his real father fought the Shadow King on the astral plane, but had to give his son up for adoption to protect him from the entity. During Shadow King's interrogation of David's adopted sister regarding his real father, a glimpse of Professor Xavier's iconic chair from the X-Men films is shown.

The series' writer, producer, and showrunner, Noah Hawley has stated that the show has potential to crossover into the other installments in the franchise, should the show continue. He has also stated that the series will acknowledge all of Haller's past, including the fact that he is Xavier's son, though neither McAvoy nor Stewart will appear in the first season. During an appearance on the Late Late Show with James Corden, Legion star Dan Stevens personally offered Stewart an invitation to appear on the show. Despite previously stating he would be retiring from the role following the release of Logan, Stewart replied he was "Absolutely 100%" willing to reprise the role under such circumstances.

In February 2019, it was announced that Harry Lloyd would portray Professor X in the third and final season.

Films 

Xavier has appeared in eleven live-action feature films to date. He is played by Patrick Stewart in the X-Men films X-Men, X2, X-Men: The Last Stand, X-Men Origins: Wolverine, The Wolverine, and Logan and the Marvel Cinematic Universe (MCU) film Doctor Strange in the Multiverse of Madness, and by James McAvoy in X-Men: First Class, X-Men: Apocalypse, Deadpool 2 and Dark Phoenix. Both actors play him at different time-periods in X-Men: Days of Future Past. It is implied that Xavier is one of the most powerful mutants in the world. Although Xavier is American-born in the comics and in animation, he speaks with a British accent in the films (although First Class establishes that he lived in the United States during childhood, though he may have picked up the accent from his English mother).

Books 
The X-Men novel "Shadows of the Past" by Michael Jan Friedman (set in the continuity of the comics) opens with Xavier attending the funeral of one of his old professors, Jeremiah Saunders, only to be captured on the way back to the mansion by the forces of his old adversary Lucifer, who replaces Xavier with a duplicate of himself made of ionic energy, possessing Xavier's powers and memories but programmed to be loyal to Lucifer. Other ionic constructs use equipment in a Quistalium facility on Earth to transfer Xavier into the Nameless Dimension where Lucifer has been imprisoned since one of his last attacks on Earth, the Nameless Dimension being a strange void full of 'liquid' that Xavier and Lucifer can breathe as though it is still oxygen. Lucifer intends to use the duplicate Xavier to retrieve key devices from other Quistalium outposts on Earth that can be used to modify the equipment that transferred Xavier to the Nameless Dimension, reconfiguring it so that Lucifer will be able to escape back into this world, assigning that task to the original five X-Men while claiming that the device is to be used as part of a machine that 'Xavier' has created to protect Earth from future invasion. Xavier is able to telepathically reach beyond the Nameless Dimension back to Earth, but cannot contact the X-Men as his telepathic powers are too weak to make contact with them amid their complex thoughts across the dimensional barrier. Fortunately, Xavier is able to contact Jeffrey Saunders, Jeremiah's grandson, who possesses a brain defect that hampers his ability to process information, Jeffrey's physically superior body allowing Xavier to travel to the mansion and expose his duplicate as a fake. With the X-Men alerted to Lucifer's deception, they are able to use the equipment to retrieve Xavier from the Nameless Dimension before destroying it, trapping Lucifer all over again.

In the X-Men/Star Trek crossover novel Planet X, Archangel and Beverly Crusher program a copy of Professor X into the holodeck of the Enterprise-E based on Archangel's own knowledge of the professor and information the Enterprise downloaded from the Xavier Mansion's computers during their visit to the Marvel Universe. Crusher privately reflects that Professor X and Captain Picard look surprisingly similar, with the two sharing the same thoughts when they later meet. Accepting his status as a hologram of himself, Xavier assists Doctor Crusher in developing a cure for the 'transformed', a group of artificially-created mutants on a planet that the Enterprise is visiting. In a later meeting with Picard, Xavier invites the captain to return and speak with him in the future if his personality will remain in the holodecks after the current crisis has been resolved, Picard assuring the Professor that he would be honoured to do so as he compliments Xavier's success in bringing the X-Men together given their diverse personalities and powers.

The Chaos Engine trilogy sees Xavier and a team of X-Men become aware that an initially-unknown force has rewritten their reality while they were in the Starlight Citadel, Roma allowing them time to restore their reality before she has to destroy it to prevent the corruption of the multiverse. After the X-Men- Cyclops, Jean Grey, Wolverine, Gambit, Rogue and Nightcrawler- learn that reality was reshaped by Doctor Doom using a flawed Cosmic Cube, Magneto acquires the Cube and uses it to create his own perfect world, leaving Xavier with only Psylocke as an ally as Jean was able to restore Psylocke's memories of the true reality before the reset. Xavier is able to convince Magneto that he cannot use the Cube this way without destroying everything, but the two are attacked by the Red Skull before they can restore the real world. In this new reality, Xavier is a willing traitor to his own kind, using his abilities to identify and expose mutants to the Nazi rulers of Earth in exchange for his own freedom. Fortunately, various X-Men are able to restore their original personas and turn the tables on the Skull, allowing them to return reality to normal.

Video games 
Professor X appears in most of the X-Men video games.

 He is almost always an NPC and advises the X-Men on various missions in the role playing games.
 In the case of the fighting games, he appears in some of the characters' endings. In Marvel VS. Capcom, he is possessed by Onslaught, the game's final boss.
 He appears in the X-Men: Mutant Academy game for the Sony PlayStation, helping the player in Academy Mode.
 He appears in the X-Men: Mutant Academy 2 game for the Sony PlayStation, as an unlockable playable character.
 He appears in the training modes for Spider-Man 2: Enter Electro voiced by Daran Norris.
 Xavier is also a playable character in the game X-Men Legends, and its sequel X-Men Legends II: Rise of Apocalypse (in the first game, he is playable in one level and when all danger room discs are completed; in the second, he is playable once all the Danger Room missions are completed. He also appears as a major NPC in both games). Patrick Stewart voices Xavier in both Legends games. When playable, he is seen without his wheelchair.
 Professor X appears as an NPC in the game Marvel: Ultimate Alliance voiced by Tom Kane. He helps the heroes by using Cerebro to locate Nightcrawler and Jean Grey. He is amongst the heroes who are defeated by Doctor Doom and seen on the ground next to Magneto with his wheelchair demolished. Also in the game, if the player chooses to save Jean Grey from being dropped into the Infinity Vortex, Mystique will avenge Nightcrawler by infiltrating the X-Mansion at night to vent her frustration upon Professor X where he will die in a coma months later and his death will cause the X-Men to disband forever (Cyclops, Wolverine, and surprisingly Nightcrawler, are among the X-Men seen surrounding his grave). Professor X has special dialogue with Iceman, Wolverine, Storm, and Magneto.
 He is briefly mentioned by Lisa Simpson in The Simpsons Game concerning the families' powers.
 Professor X appears in the PlayStation 2 and version of Spider-Man: Web of Shadows. He appears as an assist character who uses his telepathy upon the enemies.
 In X-Men: Destiny, it is revealed that Professor X is dead as there is a memorial for him at the beginning of the game.
 Professor X appears in Marvel: Avengers Alliance. He appears as a non-playable character in Season 2.
 Professor X appeared as a playable character in Lego Marvel Super Heroes, voiced by James Arnold Taylor. Wolverine brings the Tesseract to Professor X hoping that he would be able to unlock its secrets only for Magneto and the Brotherhood of Mutants to attack. One of the missions he gives to the players is to use a psychic character to guide a student through a maze.
 Professor X appeared in Marvel Heroes, with Jim Ward reprising his role.
 Professor X appears in the "Rise of the Phoenix" DLC of Marvel Ultimate Alliance 3: The Black Order, voiced by Keith Ferguson.
 Professor X is introduced as a playable character in the mobile game Marvel: Future Fight as part of the House of X and Powers of X Update. The character currently can only be purchased through Danger Room limited offers.
 Professor X appears as a playable character in MOBA game Marvel Super War. His role is Support, his passive allows him to break enemy’s resistance both physical and energy. He’s also able to control an enemy with his telepathy. His ultimate skill is global scale, where he uses Cerebro to scan all enemies in battlefield, before putting them to sleep after set amount of time.

References